Joseph Rémy (born 23 September 1906, date of death unknown) is a Belgian boxer who competed in the 1924 Summer Olympics. In 1924 he was eliminated in the first round of the welterweight class after losing to Roy Ingram of South Africa.

References

External links
 Joseph Rémy's profile at Sports Reference.com

1906 births
Year of death missing
Welterweight boxers
Olympic boxers of Belgium
Boxers at the 1924 Summer Olympics
Belgian male boxers